John Smithwick may refer to:
 John H. Smithwick, U.S. Representative from Florida. 
 John Francis Smithwick, Irish businessman and politician
 John Smithwick, founder in 1710 of Smithwick's brewery, Kilkenny, Ireland